Greg Walker (born February 18, 1964) is an American rower. He competed in the men's single sculls event at the 1992 Summer Olympics.

References

External links
 

1964 births
Living people
American male rowers
Olympic rowers of the United States
Rowers at the 1992 Summer Olympics
People from Mount Clemens, Michigan
Pan American Games medalists in rowing
Pan American Games gold medalists for the United States
Rowers at the 1987 Pan American Games
Sportspeople from Metro Detroit